are small wooden plaques, common to Japan, in which Shinto and Buddhist worshippers write prayers or wishes.  are left hanging up at the shrine, where the  (spirits or gods) are believed to receive them. In ancient times, people would donate horses to the shrines for good favor; over time this was transferred to a wooden plaque with a picture of a horse, and later still to the various wooden plaques sold today for the same purpose. Once inscribed with a wish,  are hung at the shrine until they are ritually burned at special events, symbolic of the liberation of the wish from the writer.

History 
Horses were extremely expensive, and figures made of clay or wood have been found dating to the Nara period.

The depictions of objects aside from horses can be traced to either the Muromachi or Tokugawa periods, beginning with larger sized  (named , literally 'large ') but also representing new forms, such as ships. Artists of this period, such as Hokusai, began to create  in distinct styles, and creating the objects became a professionalized craft.

Today, they are mostly produced at or by the shrine or temple in which they are found. In 1979, two shrines dedicated to education sold  for examination success, transforming the funds into a scholarship in 1980 after public outcry.

Symbols 

Archeological records suggest this could have been used to send political signals, as in the case of a Fukuoka Prefecture shrine that saw an increase in commissioned portraits depicting peaceful relations with Korea amidst tensions between the nations during the late 19th century.

 can represent deities, such as Kannon and Jizō, but also more specific iconography depending on their intended purpose. These include depictions of a phallus or breasts for fertility prayers, or an octopus representing the desire to be cured of warts. Another example are sandals depicted on plaques for foot remedies. Another form of  wish is for "tie-cutting"; whereas a man and woman standing beside a palm tree is interpreted as a wish for a long relationship, another plaque depicts nettles between the couple, wishing for divorce. Common symbolism also includes nettles placed beside an object one wishes to sever ties with. During wartime,  depicting the same man, one in military uniform and one in civilian clothing, suggested a desire for a soldier to sever from his civilian life. For some, the same image may have been used to express a wish to avoid military service altogether.

The use of text has gradually replaced the overt use of symbolism in contemporary . The rise of literacy has encouraged guests to write their own messages, which has dramatically decreased the use of distinct  as a way to transmit a specific wish.

Function
Burning the wishes helps to "symbolically liberate" the spirit of the wish into the world. In some cases, however, wishes are taken from the shrine to be hung at home, though still ritually burned in special ceremonies.

See also
 Glossary of Shinto, for an explanation of terms concerning Japanese Shinto, Shinto art, and Shinto shrine architecture.

References

External links

Shinto in Japan
Buddhism in Japan
Shinto religious objects
Prayer
Wood products